The Best American Short Stories 2011, a volume in the Best American Short Stories series,  was edited by Heidi Pitlor and by guest editor Geraldine Brooks.

Short Stories included

Notes

External links
 Best American Short Stories

2011 anthologies
American anthologies
Houghton Mifflin books
Short Stories 2011